This is a list of episodes for Rovio Entertainment's animated series Angry Birds Toons. A total of 52 three-minute episodes were released in the first season, with Rovio releasing one episode per week between 16 March 2013 and 8 March 2014.

Each episode premiered on Comcast's on-demand services, Roku's set-top boxes, and Samsung's smart TVs, and was broadcast on television in 12 countries one day before its release through all Angry Birds applications for smartphones and tablets. 

A second season of the series, consisting of 26 episodes, ran between 14 October 2014 and 12 April 2015. The third season of the series, started on 1 October 2015 and 13 May 2016, The TV series closed and its feature film, and celebrated its 100th episode on 15 April 2016.

During the course of the series, 104 episodes of the series have aired over three seasons.

Series overview

Episodes

Season 1 (2013–14)

Season 2 (2014–15)

Season 3 (2015–16)

Home media
Sony Pictures Home Entertainment (who coincidentally later released The Angry Birds Movie through Columbia Pictures) is the DVD/Blu-ray distributor for the series. While the first season got a Blu-Ray release, later releases starting with season two were only available on DVD.

References

See also
Angry Birds
Angry Birds 2

External links
 

Angry Birds Toons
Angry Birds